Mojinete is one of the cantons of the Mojinete Municipality, the second municipal section of the Sur Lípez Province in the Potosí Department of Bolivia. During the census of 2001 it had 376 inhabitants. Its seat is Mojinete with a population of 271 in 2001.

References

External links
Mojinete Municipality: population data and map

Cantons of Potosí Department
Cantons of Bolivia